Currys (branded as Currys PC World between 2010 and 2021) is an electrical retailer and aftercare service provider operating in the United Kingdom and Ireland, specialising in white goods, consumer electronics, computers and mobile phones. 

Established as a bicycle retailer in 1927, Currys expanded the range of goods sold and from the 1960s became a major retailer of household electrical items. In 1984 the company was bought by rival retailer Dixons, and the Currys brand was used for all outlets of the combined company. From 2008, the business turned away from shops in town centres to larger out-of-town stores under the Currys PC World brand, combining the operations of Currys with Dixon's PC World under one roof; after the formation of Dixons Carphone in 2014, the stores gained Carphone Warehouse departments. It was announced in July 2021 that all Currys PC World stores would be rebranded to Currys.

History

Early years
Henry Curry started to make bicycles in Leicester in 1884. Currys was incorporated as a business in 1927 when his four sons merged The Louth Bicycle Company, and the loose confederation of shops which the sons had run since their father's retirement in 1909, with the Nottingham-based Campion Cycle Company.

By the 1940s, the shops sold a wide variety of goods including bicycles, toys, radios and gramophones.

Meanwhile, particularly under the directorship between 1967 and 1984 of Dennis Curry, grandson of Henry Curry, the company underwent considerable expansion to become a major high street supplier of televisions and white goods (refrigerators, washing machines and other domestic appliances); by 1984 Currys Group plc had 570 shops, twice as many as the company which was then to acquire it.

Takeover by Dixons

In 1984, Currys was taken over by Dixons (another electrical products retail chain, now Currys Plc) but maintained its separate brand identity. In April 2006, Dixons Stores Group announced that its Dixons shops, except in Ireland and in duty-free areas in airports, would be rebranded as Currys.digital (later changed to Currys Digital). In Ireland, the Dixons shops in Ireland were rebranded as Currys in August 2008.

Before the Dixons rebranding, the chain had only a few small town centre shops compared with its much greater number of large out-of-town megastores. On 17 January 2007, group chief executive John Clare announced that when the leases on the remaining 'Currys High Street' shops (not the rebranded Currys.digital shops) expired, it would be unlikely that they would be renewed: thus the shops would be closed at the earliest opportunity.

Currys PC World 

Dixons Retail began a trial combining Currys and PC World shops in 2008. During the Dixons Carphone Christmas 2015–2016 results update to shareholders, Sebastian James, group chief executive, revealed that over the following financial year the three-in-one shop format (shops featuring Currys, PC World and Carphone Warehouse branding under one roof) would be rolled out across the company's entire portfolio in the United Kingdom and the Republic of Ireland.

Revival of Currys as sole brand 
Following reorganisations in 2020 and 2021, Dixons Carphone announced that the Currys PC World stores would be rebranded to Currys in October 2021.

References

External links

 (United Kingdom)
Official website (Ireland)

1884 establishments in England
Consumer electronics retailers of the United Kingdom
Currys plc
Retail companies established in 1884